Baliyo Ghar (बलियो घर) is a  Nepali television series; focused on the safer reconstruction of Nepal, after the April 2015 Nepal earthquake. It first began airing on May 31, 2016 on 4 leading national tv channels; Kantipur Television, News 24 (Nepal), Image Channel and Avenues Television weekly 3 times from each.

It has also been a platform for learning, sharing and advocating for safer reconstruction. Baliyo Ghar covers diverse issues of reconstruction policy to technology to local practice and various phase and aspect of reconstruction processes.
 
With the funding support from USAID, The NSET and All Three Media Ghar are presenting this program.

Production Team
 Chief Program Producer : Sunil Koirala
 Program Producer : Shiva Shrestha
 Visual Editor : Sanam Shrestha
 Researcher/Reporter : Mimraj Pandeya
 Program coordinator : Ananda Poudel
 Camera Person : Ratnamani Dahal & Kumar Katwal

External links
 Official Website 

Nepalese television series
2010s Nepalese television series
2007 Nepalese television series debuts